Chaka Salt Lake is a salt lake in Ulan County, Haixi Prefecture, Qinghai, China. The oval-shaped lake is located near the eastern end of Qaidam Basin,  to the west of the provincial capital Xining. The name "Chaka" (ཚྭ་ཁ) means "salt lake" in Tibetan.

Chaka Lake is a major tourist destination and a key salt mine in Qinghai. In 2018, it received more than 3 million visitors. The lake is famous for its crystal-blue water and reflective lake bed, and is popularly known as "Mirror of the Sky".

References

Lakes of China
Lakes of Qinghai
Tourist attractions in Qinghai